World in My Pocket (also known as On Friday at Eleven) is a 1961 European crime-drama film directed by Alvin Rakoff. The film was a co-production between West Germany (where it was released as An einem Freitag um halb zwölf), France (where is known as Vendredi 13 heures) and Italy (where is known as Il mondo nella mia tasca).

It was shot at the Spandau Studios and on location in Marseille. The film's sets were designed by the art directors Hans Kuhnert and Wilhelm Vorwerg. It is based on the 1959 novel The World in My Pocket by James Hadley Chase.

Cast 
 Nadja Tiller as  Ginny
 Peter van Eyck as  Bleck
 Rod Steiger as  Frank Morgan
 Jean Servais as  Gypo
 Ian Bannen as  Kitson
 Marisa Merlini as  Frau Mandini
 Memmo Carotenuto as  Herr Mandini
 Edoardo Nevola as  Carlo Mandini
 Carlo Giustini as  Pierre

References

Bibliography
 Goble, Alan. The Complete Index to Literary Sources in Film. Walter de Gruyter, 1999.

External links
 

1961 films
1961 crime drama films
1960s crime thriller films
1960s heist films
German crime thriller films
French crime thriller films
French heist films
Italian crime thriller films
Italian heist films
West German films
English-language French films
English-language German films
English-language Italian films
Films based on works by James Hadley Chase
Films based on British novels
Films directed by Alvin Rakoff
Films set in France
Films shot in Marseille
Constantin Film films
Metro-Goldwyn-Mayer films
Films shot at Spandau Studios
Films scored by Claude Bolling
1960s English-language films
1960s Italian films
1960s French films
1960s German films